Public Interest Research Groups (PIRGs) are a federation of U.S. and Canadian non-profit organizations that employ grassroots organizing and direct advocacy on issues such as consumer protection, public health and transportation. The PIRGs are closely affiliated with the  Fund for the Public Interest, which conducts fundraising and canvassing on their behalf.

History
The PIRGs emerged in the early 1970s on U.S. college campuses. The PIRG model was proposed in the book Action for a Change by Ralph Nader and Donald Ross, in which they encourage students on campuses across a state to pool their resources to hire full-time professional lobbyists and researchers to lobby for the passage of legislation which addresses social topics of interest to students. Ross helped students across the country set up the first PIRG chapters, then became the director of the New York Public Interest Research Group in 1973.

The Minnesota Public Interest Research Group, founded in 1971, was the first state PIRG to incorporate. It was followed by Oregon (OSPIRG) and Massachusetts (MASSPIRG). By the late 1990s, there were PIRGs in 22 states with chapters on more than 100 college campuses. U.S. PIRG reported 1 million members by 2000. The state PIRGs created U.S. PIRG in 1984 to have a national lobbying presence in Washington, D.C.

In their first two decades, PIRGs worked on a variety of issues:
 Bottle bills: Beginning in the late 1970s and continuing into the 1980s, the PIRGs were supportive of container deposit legislation in the United States, popularly called "bottle bills". MASSPIRG lobbied for six years for enactment of a state bottle return law, eventually winning container deposit legislation in 1982.
 Toy safety: U.S. PIRG has released toy safety reports every year since 1986, which has led to recalls of more than 35 toys.
 Lemon law: ConnPIRG and CALPIRG were involved in passing the first new-car lemon laws in 1982 that require manufacturers to repair or repurchase severely defective relatively new vehicles.
Safer art supplies: CALPIRG led the effort to enact the nation's first laws protecting children and artists from toxins in art supplies in 1985. USPIRG followed with a federal law in 1988.

Funding model
PIRGs on college campuses have historically been funded with a portion of student activity fees in the form of a labor checkoff. Students may elect to have the fees refunded to them, although many students are unaware that this is the case. In 1982, the PIRGs established the Fund for the Public Interest (commonly referred to as "the Fund") as its fundraising and canvassing arm.

Controversies
The student fee system of PIRG funding has been met with controversy and with a number of legal challenges. In 2014, students at Macalester College in Minnesota voted to end their relationship with MPIRG due to the group's revenue structure, which relied on MPIRG automatically receiving a cut of student activity fees.

The Fund For the Public Interest has been subject to lawsuits and accusations of unfair and exploitative labor practices, and it has resisted unionization efforts by its canvassers.

In 2016, U.S. PIRG joined conservative groups in opposing the Obama Administration's rules that expanded worker overtime pay, which resulted in criticism against the organization in the popular press.

Transparency
Based on data from the 2018 Fiscal Year, Charity Navigator rated the U.S. PIRG one out of four stars for accountability and transparency (67.00 out of 100), and three out of four stars for financials (82.36 out of 100), for an overall rating of two out of four stars (73.54 out of 100).

Programs and campaigns

Consumer protection
U.S. PIRG’s consumer protection work includes financial and product safety reforms.

U.S. PIRG lobbied for the creation of the Consumer Financial Protection Bureau, an independent U.S. government agency which was founded as a result of the Dodd–Frank Wall Street Reform and Consumer Protection Act after the Great Recession and the financial crisis of 2007–2008. U.S. PIRG helped win passage of the Credit CARD Act of 2009, protecting consumers from certain predatory practices by credit card companies.

Product safety work includes warning consumers about potentially unsafe products in the marketplace, such as recalled baby products and food.

Public health
U.S. PIRG has called on major restaurant chains including McDonald’s and KFC
to end the use of meat raised with antibiotics, a practice that contributes to antibiotic-resistant bacteria in people. During the coronavirus pandemic, U.S. PIRG organized medical experts to speak about the U.S.’s response to the COVID-19 pandemic. The group of 150 sent a letter to political leaders urging them to shut down the country and start over with strategies to contain the surging coronavirus pandemic.

Transportation
U.S. PIRG and individual state PIRGs have taken positions against highway expansion or new construction projects as wastefully expensive and unneeded, helping to stop projects such as the Illiana Expressway in Illinois.

Higher education
U.S. PIRG actively lobbied for passage of the College Cost Reduction and Access Act in 2007, which reduced interest rates on student loans and increased funding for Pell Grants. It supported the expansion of open educational resources on campus and of campus food banks.

Affiliated non-profits
Some PIRGs are members of a larger network of non-profit organizations called the Public Interest Network. In the past, they have also helped to launch a number of other independent public interest non-profits, including:
 Citizen utility boards
 The National Environmental Law Center

State affiliates
Twenty-five U.S. states have a statewide PIRG that is directly affiliated with the Public Interest Network/U.S. PIRG. Other state PIRGs that are not part of the network include the New York, Vermont, Alaska, and Minnesota PIRGs. The state PIRGs are:

 AKPIRG (Alaska)*
 Arizona PIRG
 CALPIRG (California)
 CoPIRG (Colorado)
 ConnPIRG (Connecticut)
 Florida PIRG
 Georgia PIRG
 Illinois PIRG
 Iowa PIRG
MaryPIRG (Maryland)
MassPIRG (Massachusetts)
PIRGIM (Michigan)
MPIRG (Minnesota)*
MoPIRG (Missouri)
 MontPIRG (Montana)
 NHPIRG (New Hampshire)
 NJPIRG (New Jersey)
 NMPIRG (New Mexico)
 NYPIRG (New York)*
 NCPIRG (North Carolina)
 Ohio PIRG
 OSPIRG (Oregon)
 RIPIRG (Rhode Island)
 Penn PIRG (Pennsylvania)
 TexPIRG (Texas)
 VPIRG (Vermont)*
 WashPIRG (Washington)
 WisPIRG (Wisconsin)

Not affiliated with the Public Interest Network.*

See also 
 Environment America

References

External links
 
 The Student PIRGs
 The Public Interest Network
 U.S. PIRG on OpenSecrets.org